Emil G. Keup (1869 – January 24, 1930) was an American politician and businessman.

Born in Oshkosh, Wisconsin, Keup went to Byrant and Stratton Business College and was involved with the Mount Morris Insurance Company. He served as chairman of the Mount Morris, Wisconsin Town Board and on the Mount Morris School Board. Keup served in the Wisconsin State Assembly in 1907 and 1909 and was a Republican. He was also a supporter of United States Senator Robert M. La Follette, Sr. and Republican Progressive politics. Keup died in Wautoma, Wisconsin while shoveling his car out from snow.

References

1869 births
1930 deaths
Politicians from Oshkosh, Wisconsin
People from Wautoma, Wisconsin
Businesspeople from Wisconsin
Wisconsin Progressives (1924)
20th-century American politicians
School board members in Wisconsin
Mayors of places in Wisconsin
People from Waushara County, Wisconsin
Republican Party members of the Wisconsin State Assembly